The Aix-en-Provence Open was a combined men's and women's clay court tennis tournament founded in 1955 as the Trophée Raquette d'Or or Golden Racket Trophy or Aix-en-Provence Golden Racket Trophy and originally staged at the Tennis Club Aixoism, then later Country Club Aixoism, Aix-en-Provence, France.

History
In July 1955 the first Trophée Raquette d'Or was held at the Tennis Club Aixois (TCA) and played across 5 clay courts was a men's event. In 1956 a women's event was staged for the first time. In 1962 Tennis Club Aixois had been expanded to the point it became a country club and was renamed as the Country Club Aixois. The men's event ran until 1974 then was not staged for the next two years until 1977 through to 1978 when the Aix-en-Provence Golden Racket ended. The women's event also ran until 1974.

In 1984 the men's event was resestablished as Aix-en-Provence Open a Grand Prix circuit event for two editions only until 1985. In 1988 the women's event was reestablished at the same venue as the WTA Aix-en-Provence Open a WTA Category 4 tournament for one edition only.

From 1985 until 2002 the Country Club Aixois did not stage anymore senior tour level tennis events. In 2003 a men's challenger event was resestablished at the venue called the Open Sainte-Victoire which ran until 2005. The club once again ceased to stage events until 2013 when it was chosen to host a new challenger event called the Open du Pays d'Aix which is still operating today.

Finals

Men's Singles
Incomplete Roll

Men's Doubles

Women's Singles
Incomplete Roll

References

Clay court tennis tournaments
Grand Prix tennis circuit
Defunct tennis tournaments in France
Sport in Bouches-du-Rhône
Aix-en-Provence